Mimili Maku Arts, often referred to as Mimili Maku, is an Aboriginal-owned and -led arts centre located in the remote community of Mimili in the Anangu Pitjantjatjara Yankunytjatjara Lands, in the remote north-west of South Australia.

The name of the arts centre refers to the Maku (witchetty grub) Dreaming, which is a significant story from the area and forms a central part of many of the Mimili Maku senior artists' paintings. However, the work of the Mimili Maku artists is diverse and represents a wide range of stories and styles.

Mimili Maku involves all members of the community and the four surrounding homelands: Perentie Bore, Wanmara, Blue Hills and Sandy Bore. One of the directors of the centre, Kunmanara (Mumu Mike) Williams said: "At Mimili Maku Arts we work together: [t]he old men and women side by side with their children and grandchildren. This is Anangu way".

Works produced by the centre's artists have been exhibited in institutions nationally and internationally, have won many prestigious art awards and are highly sought after by collectors.

History 
The community of Mimili was established in the 1970s after the land was returned to the traditional owners with the land that the community occupies previously being part of Everard Park Station. This meant that many people, who are now the elders of the community, lost their jobs at the station where they undertook mustering, droving and breaking in horses.

Since then arts have emerged as an activity that significantly benefits individuals, families and communities in many significant ways, including economically, providing employment to many local people, while at the same time being culturally beneficial. Mimili Maku is one of the more recently established art centres in the region, having been established in 2010.

Mimili Maku is part of the APY Art Centre Collective.

The gallery closed during the COVID-19 pandemic in Australia. During this time the artists worked on Robert Fielding's research project with the South Australian Museum, which focuses on intergenerational learning and cultural maintenance.

Founding member Kunmanara Mumu Mike Williams, who died in 2019, was posthumously awarded a Medal of the Order of Australia (OAM) an on 8 June 2020 in the 2020 Queen's Birthday Honours, in recognition of his service to Indigenous visual arts and the community.

Artists 

Past and present major artists at the centre include:
 Marina Pumani Brown
 Sammy Dodd (born 1948)
 Robert Fielding (artist)
 Tuppy Ngintja Goodwin (finalist NATSIAA 2018)
 Linda Puna Kantji
 Betty Kuntiwa Pumani (winner NATSIAA 2015 & 2016, Wynne Prize 2017)
 Milatjari Pumani
 Ngupulya Pumani (finalist NATSIAA 2015, finalist Wynne Prize 2017)
 Kunmanara (Mumu Mike) Williams (1952–2019) 

Other artists listed as of 2020:

 Harriette Bryant
 Alwyn Dawson
 Margaret Dodd
 Shane Dodd
 Mark Doolan
 Judy Martin
 Kunmanara Martin
 Patricia Martin
 Anita Pumani
 Brenita Pumani
 Danielle Pumani
 Josina Pumani
 Teresa Pumani-Mula
 Emma Singer
 Pauline Wangin
 Puna Yanima

External links

References 

Australian Aboriginal artists
Culture of South Australia